Empire Airways was an airline based in Farmingdale, New York, USA. It operated fixed-wing and helicopter charter services, as well as VIP, corporate shuttle, air ambulance and aircraft maintenance services. Its main base was Republic Airport.

History
The airline was established in July 2004 and plans to operate scheduled services from its base to Atlantic City for hotels and casinos. It was wholly owned by Partner Aviation Enterprises. In 2012 they closed their doors following hurricane Sandy.

Fleet
The Empire Airways fleet included the following aircraft (at June 2009):
2 × BAe Jetstream 31

Fleet included the following aircraft (at January 2009):
BAe Jetstream 31
Citation II
Citation III
Eurocopter AS355
Bell 206A Jet Ranger
Bell 206L Long Ranger
Sikorsky S-76A
Sikorsky S-92

See also 
 List of defunct airlines of the United States

References

External links
Empire Airways

Defunct airlines of the United States
Defunct charter airlines of the United States
Airlines established in 2004
Airlines disestablished in 2012
Defunct companies based in New York (state)
Airlines based in New York (state)